The Russel Erskine Hotel is an apartment building and former hotel in Huntsville, Alabama. It was named after Albert Russel Erskine. It was added to the National Register of Historic Places in 1980. The building currently houses apartments.

References

Buildings and structures in Huntsville, Alabama
National Register of Historic Places in Huntsville, Alabama
Neoclassical architecture in Alabama
Hotel buildings completed in 1928
Hotel buildings on the National Register of Historic Places in Alabama
1928 establishments in Alabama